Whitmore is a surname. Notable people with the surname include:

 Alex Whitmore (born 1995), English footballer
 Alfred Whitmore (1876–1946), English pathologist
 Derek Whitmore (born 1984), American hockey player
 Ed Whitmore, British screenwriter
 Elias Whitmore (1772–1853), US congressman from New York
Ellen Whitmore (1828-1861), American educator and missionary
 Charles Algernon Whitmore (1851–1908), British Conservative Member of Parliament (MP) for Chelsea 1886–1906
 Frank C. Whitmore (1887–1947), American chemist
 Frances Whitmore (1666–1695), English aristocrat
 Francis Whitmore (1872–1962), English soldier
 James Whitmore (1921–2009), American actor
 James Whitmore Jr. (born 1948), American actor
 John Whitmore (surfer) (1929–2001), South African surfing pioneer
 Keith Bernard Whitmore, American Episcopalian bishop
 Kelsie Whitmore (born 1998), American baseball player
 Laura Whitmore (born 1985), Irish TV presenter
 Lady Lucy Whitmore (1792–1840), English noblewoman, hymnwriter
 Mary Whitmore (1884–1974), first woman to be Mayor of Ipswich, Suffolk
 Tamika Whitmore (born 1977), American basketball player
 Theodore Whitmore (born 1972), Jamaican footballer
 William Wolryche-Whitmore (1787–1858), British MP remembered for introducing South Australia Colonisation Act

See also
Hugh Whitemore (born 1936), English playwright and screenwriter
Michael Witmore (born 1967), American Shakespeare scholar
Whittemore (surname)

English toponymic surnames